Zurück zu mir ( Back to Me) is the fourth studio album by German singer Sarah Lombardi. It was released through El Cartel Music and Universal Music on 4 May 2018 in German-speaking Europe.

Track listing

Charts

Release history

References

2018 albums
German-language albums
Sarah Lombardi albums